The William Hagerman Farmstead is a historic home located at Sharpsburg, Washington County, Maryland, United States. The house is a -story five-bay brick dwelling with a raised cellar. It features a double porch, three tiered, extending across the east gable end of the house. The house is an exceptionally intact example of an 1860s vernacular interpretation of the Italianate architecture.

The William Hagerman Farmstead was listed on the National Register of Historic Places in 2002.

References

External links
, including photo from 2002, at Maryland Historical Trust

Farms on the National Register of Historic Places in Maryland
Houses in Washington County, Maryland
Houses completed in 1860
Italianate architecture in Maryland
Sharpsburg, Maryland
National Register of Historic Places in Washington County, Maryland